In mathematics, a field F is called quasi-algebraically closed (or C1) if every non-constant homogeneous polynomial P over F has a non-trivial zero provided the number of its variables is more than its degree.  The idea of quasi-algebraically closed fields was investigated by C. C. Tsen, a student of Emmy Noether, in a 1936 paper ; and later by Serge Lang in his 1951 Princeton University dissertation and in his 1952 paper . The idea itself is attributed to Lang's advisor Emil Artin.

Formally, if P is a non-constant homogeneous polynomial in variables

X1, ..., XN,

and of degree d satisfying

d < N

then it has a non-trivial zero over F; that is, for some xi in F, not all 0, we have

P(x1, ..., xN) = 0.

In geometric language, the hypersurface defined by P, in projective space of degree N − 2,  then has a point over F.

Examples
Any algebraically closed field is quasi-algebraically closed. In fact, any homogeneous polynomial in at least two variables over an algebraically closed field has a non-trivial zero.
Any finite field is quasi-algebraically closed by the Chevalley–Warning theorem.
Algebraic function fields of dimension 1 over algebraically closed fields are quasi-algebraically closed by Tsen's theorem.
The maximal unramified extension of a complete field with a discrete valuation and a perfect residue field is quasi-algebraically closed.
A complete field with a discrete valuation and an algebraically closed residue field is quasi-algebraically closed by a result of Lang.
 A pseudo algebraically closed field of characteristic zero is quasi-algebraically closed.

Properties
Any algebraic extension of a quasi-algebraically closed field is quasi-algebraically closed.
The Brauer group of a finite extension of a quasi-algebraically closed field is trivial.
A quasi-algebraically closed field has cohomological dimension at most 1.

Ck fields
Quasi-algebraically closed fields are also called C1. A Ck field, more generally, is one for which any homogeneous polynomial of degree d in N variables has a non-trivial zero, provided

dk < N,

for k ≥ 1.  The condition was first introduced and studied by Lang.  If a field is Ci then so is a finite extension.  The C0 fields are precisely the algebraically closed fields.

Lang and Nagata proved that if a field is Ck, then any extension of transcendence degree n is Ck+n.  The smallest k such that K is a Ck field ( if no such number exists), is called the diophantine dimension dd(K) of K.

C1 fields

Every finite field is C1.

C2 fields

Properties
Suppose that the field k is C2.
 Any skew field D finite over k as centre has the property that the reduced norm D∗ → k∗ is surjective.
 Every quadratic form in 5 or more variables over k is isotropic.

Artin's conjecture
Artin conjectured that p-adic fields were C2, but 
Guy Terjanian found p-adic counterexamples for all p.  The Ax–Kochen theorem  applied methods from model theory to show that Artin's conjecture was true for Qp with p large enough (depending on d).

Weakly Ck fields
A field K is weakly Ck,d if for every homogeneous polynomial of degree d in N variables satisfying
dk < N
the Zariski closed set V(f) of Pn(K) contains a subvariety which is Zariski closed over K.

A field which is weakly Ck,d for every d is weakly Ck.

Properties
 A Ck field is weakly Ck.
 A perfect PAC weakly Ck field is Ck.
 A field K is weakly Ck,d if and only if every form satisfying the conditions has a point x defined over a field which is a primary extension of K.
 If a field is weakly Ck, then any extension of transcendence degree n is weakly Ck+n.
 Any extension of an algebraically closed field is weakly C1.
 Any field with procyclic absolute Galois group is weakly C1.
 Any field of positive characteristic is weakly C2.
 If the field of rational numbers  and the function fields  are weakly C1, then every field is weakly C1.

See also
 Brauer's theorem on forms
 Tsen rank

Citations

References

 
 
 
 
 
  
 
 

Field (mathematics)
Diophantine geometry